Hidemaro (written: 秀麿 or 英麿) is a masculine Japanese given name. Notable people with the name include:

, Japanese video game designer
, Japanese classical composer and conductor
, Japanese footballer

Japanese masculine given names